The Worldwide Online Olympiad Training (WOOT) program was established in 2005 by Art of Problem Solving, with sponsorship from Google and quantitative hedge fund giant D. E. Shaw & Co., in order to meet the needs of the world's top high school math students.  Sponsorship allowed free enrollment for students of the Mathematical Olympiad Program (MOP).  D.E. Shaw continues to sponsor enrollment of those students for the 2006-2007 year of WOOT.

Program 
The focus on the WOOT program is taking already excellent pre-college students deeper into their studies of elementary mathematics, with a focus on proof-writing.
 Numerous exams are given over the course of the program and graded by undergraduates at MIT and Harvard.  Feedback on proofs is returned to students electronically within a couple weeks of exam submission.  These tests are styled after the American Invitational Mathematics Examination (AIME) and the International Mathematics Olympiad (IMO)
 Online classes are given throughout the school year on topics such as bridging ideas between different areas of math (using algebraic tactics on number theory problems), combinatorial geometry, inequalities (such as the Cauchy–Schwarz inequality), invariants, and proof writing.
 Problem sets are given out on a private LaTeX-enabled WOOT phpbb message board where students post proofs, discuss problem solving tactics, and review each other's solutions.
 A private, LaTeX-enabled chatroom allows students to discuss problems at any time.

Students 
During the first year (2005–2006) of the WOOT program, a little over 100 students participated, over 90% of whom were among the fewer than 500 qualifiers for the 2006 United States of America Mathematics Olympiad (USAMO), including most of the competition's 12 "winners."  Several participants from the United States and other countries won medals at the 2006 IMO held in Slovenia.

Instructors 
WOOT students (WOOTers) are guided by veterans of national and international mathematics competitions such as IMO medalists, winners of the USAMO, a former Westinghouse competition winner, a Canadian Math Olympiad winner, perfect scorers on the AIME, perfect scorers on the American High School Mathematics Examination (now the American Mathematics Competitions), and a perfect scorer at the national MathCounts competition.

External links 
 WOOT information -- with references to much of the information above.

Recurring sporting events established in 2005